Jacques de Cambrai (fl. c. 1260–80), sometimes Jaque or Jaikes, was a trouvère from Cambrai. He composed four chansons courtoises, one pastourelle, six devotional chansons, and one Marian rotrouenge. The Berne manuscript preserves all his works, nine of them uniquely. In addition, a chanson and the pastourelle are preserved in the manuscript Oxford Douce 308 and one of the devotional songs is also copied in two other sources. The Berne manuscript notes that his Haute dame, com rose et lis was modelled on (i.e. a contrafactum of) Ausi com l'unicorne sui by Theobald I of Navarre and Mere, douce creature on Quant voi la glaie meure by Raoul de Soissons. Otherwise none of his music survives, though staves for its transcription were prepared. Of all Jacques's works, only his rotrouenge, the Retrowange novelle, has no model mentioned in the manuscripts; its rubric reads only "Jaikes de Cambrai—De Notre Dame" (Jaque of Cambrai—On Our Lady).

Jacques's devotional songs emphasise Jesus' humanity and his Passion. These may be directed at the Cathars, who denied Christ's humanity. Jacques was one of the last medieval French poets to express his devotion to Mary primarily through chansons, that is, modelled on the chansons courtoises or love songs. After him the tendency was to use the serventois and even later the chant royal.

Works
Secular love songs
 RS933 Amours et jolietés (in CH-BEsu 389, f.7v)
 RS1031 Or m'est bel du tens d'avri (in CH-BEsu 389, f.169r)
 RS1631 = RS1617 Force d'Amour me destraint et justise (in CH-BEsu 389, f.77v; also in GB-Ob Douce 308)
 RS2044 N'est pas courtois, ains est fols et estous (in CH-BEsu 389, f.158r)

Pastourelles
 RS1855 Ier matinet delés un vert buisson (in CH-BEsu 389, f.65r; also in GB-Ob Douce 308)

Marian poems and their models

Discography 
 Graindelavoix, Confréries: , 2013, Glossa Music GCD P32108.

References
Notes

Bibliography
Karp, Theodore. "Jaque de Cambrai." Grove Music Online. Oxford Music Online. Accessed 20 September 2008.
O'Sullivan, Daniel E. (2005). Marian devotion in thirteenth-century French lyric. Toronto: University of Toronto Press. .
Rivière, Jean-Claude, ed. (1978). Les Poésies du Trouvère Jacques de Cambrai, avec Introduction, Etudes thématiques, Notices et Glossaire. Geneva: Droz.

Trouvères
Medieval Christian devotional writers
Year of birth unknown
Year of death unknown
French classical composers
French male classical composers
13th-century French poets
13th-century French musicians